Walter F. Scott (December 5, 1856 – February 15, 1938) was an American banker and politician from Brandon, Vermont. A Republican, he served in the Vermont House of Representatives and Vermont Senate, and as Vermont State Treasurer.

Biography
Scott was born in Barre, Vermont on December 5, 1856.  He was educated at Goddard Seminary in Barre.  In 1873 he became a resident of Brandon.

Banking career
He worked as a clerk for the Central Vermont Railway.  In 1880 he began a banking career as a teller at the Brandon National Bank. Scott became the bank's cashier in 1883.

Scott also operated a farm, which included breeding Ayrshire cattle.

Political career
A Republican, he served as Brandon's town treasurer and a justice of the peace for many years.  He represented Brandon in the Vermont House of Representatives in 1906.  In 1908 he served in the Vermont Senate.

State treasurer
In 1914 Scott was the successful Republican nominee for state treasurer.  He was reelected in 1916, 1918, and 1920, and served from 1915 to 1923.

Later career
Scott became president of the Brandon National Bank, and remained active until his death.

Fraternal memberships
In addition to being active in Brandon's Masonic lodge, Scott was active in both Royal Arch Masonry and the Knights Templar.

Family
Having remained a bachelor until he was over 60, in 1920 Scott married Lucretia Ballard, the divorced mother of a son who was born in 1920.

Death and burial
Scott died in Brandon on February 15, 1938.  He was buried at Greenwood Cemetery in St. Albans, Vermont.

References

External links
State Treasurers, 1778-Present at Vermont Secretary of State

1856 births
1938 deaths
People from Brandon, Vermont
American bank presidents
Republican Party members of the Vermont House of Representatives
Republican Party Vermont state senators
State treasurers of Vermont
Burials in Vermont